The Arumeru East by-election was a by-election held for the Tanzanian parliamentary constituency of Arumeru East. It was triggered by the death of Jeremiah Sumari, the previous Member of Parliament (MP) who had held the seat for the Chama Cha Mapinduzi since 2005. The by-election took place on 1 April 2012 and the Chadema candidate won by 54.92%.

Results

References

By-elections in Tanzania
2012 elections in Tanzania
April 2012 events in Africa